Events in the year 1736 in Norway.

Incumbents
Monarch: Christian VI

Events
 Mandatory confirmation is introduced.

Arts and literature

The construction of Dovre Church is finished, with a  pulpit carved by Lars Pinnerud.

Births
5 August – Christian Kølle, educator (died 1814)

Deaths

23 July – Anna Colbjørnsdatter, national heroine (born 1665 or 1667).
18 December – Christian Stub, jurist, law historian and civil servant (born 1693).

See also

References